Good Friday is a Christian holiday remembering the crucifixion of Jesus Christ and his death at Calvary.

Good Friday may also refer to:

 Good Friday Agreement, a major political development in the Northern Ireland peace process of the 1990s
 "Good Friday" (song), a 1983 song by Modern Romance
 "Good Friday", a 1996 song by The Black Crowes on their album Three Snakes and One Charm
 Good Friday (album), a 1967 album by The Easybeats
 GOOD Fridays, 2010 and 2016 giveaway of songs by Kanye West